The 2017 Tashkent Open was a WTA International tennis tournament played on outdoor hard courts. It was the 19th edition of the Tashkent Open, on the 2017 WTA Tour. It took place at the Olympic Tennis School in Tashkent, Uzbekistan, between September 25 and 30, 2017.

Points and prize money

Point distribution

Prize money

1 Qualifiers prize money is also the Round of 32 prize money
* per team

Singles main-draw entrants

Seeds 

 1 Rankings as of September 18, 2017

Other entrants 
The following players received wildcards into the singles main draw:
  Nigina Abduraimova
  Akgul Amanmuradova
  Sabina Sharipova

The following players received entry using protected rankings:
  Vitalia Diatchenko
  Misa Eguchi
  Stefanie Vögele

The following players received entry from the qualifying draw:
  Lizette Cabrera
  Jana Fett
  Irina Khromacheva
  Vera Zvonareva

Withdrawals 
Before the tournament
  Julia Boserup → replaced by  Kateryna Kozlova
  Kirsten Flipkens → replaced by  Stefanie Vögele

Retirements 
  Vera Zvonareva

Doubles main-draw entrants

Seeds 

1 Rankings as of September 18, 2017

Other entrants 
The following pairs received wildcards into the doubles main draw:
 Olesya Kim /  Sevil Yuldasheva
 Kristýna Plíšková /  Iroda Tulyaganova

Withdrawals 
During the tournament
 Evgeniya Rodina

Champions

Singles 

  Kateryna Bondarenko def.  Tímea Babos, 6–4, 6–4

Doubles 

  Tímea Babos /  Andrea Hlaváčková def.  Nao Hibino /  Oksana Kalashnikova, 7–5, 6–4

External links 
 

 
2017
2017 in Uzbekistani sport
Tashkent Open
Tashkent Open